David Stone Martin, born David Livingstone Martin (June 13, 1913 – March 6, 1992 in New London, Connecticut) was an American artist best known for his illustrations on jazz record albums.

Biography

David Stone Martin was born June 13, 1913, in Chicago and attended evening classes at the School of the Art Institute of Chicago. He was greatly influenced by the line art of Ben Shahn. During World War II, Martin was an art director for the United States Office of War Information.
By 1950, Martin had produced more than 100 covers for Mercury, Asch, Disc and Dial record albums. Many assignments came from his longtime friend, record producer Norman Granz.

For various companies, Martin eventually created illustrations for more than 400 record albums. Many of these were simply line art combined with a single color. Martin's favorite tool was a crowquill pen which enabled him to do delicate line work. CBS-TV art director William Golden gave Martin many print ad assignments during the 1950s, and Martin soon expanded into illustration for Seventeen, The Saturday Evening Post and other slick magazines of the 1950s and 1960s. His studio was located in Roosevelt, New Jersey, near his home there.

Martin is represented in the Museum of Modern Art, the Metropolitan Museum of Art, the Art Institute of Chicago and the Smithsonian Institution.

Martin was the husband of muralist Thelma Martin, who painted the post office mural for the facility in Sweetwater, Tennessee. He was the father of graphic artist Stefan Martin (born 1936) and painter Tony Martin. He died March 6, 1992, in New London, Connecticut, where he had lived in his old age.

Notable album covers
All or Nothing at All, Billie Holiday, Verve
The Astaire Story, Fred Astaire, Clef
Billie Holiday Sings, Clef
Bird & Diz, Charlie Parker and Dizzy Gillespie, Clef
Buddy and Sweets,  Harry "Sweets" Edison and Buddy Rich, Norgran
An Evening with Billie Holiday, Clef
Jazz Giant, Bud Powell, Norgran
Lester Young Trio, Mercury
Lester Young with the Oscar Peterson Trio, Norgran
Love Is a Gentle Thing, Harry Belafonte, RCA
Oscar Peterson Plays Duke Ellington, Clef
Oscar Peterson Plays Porgy & Bess, Verve
Piano Interpretations by Bud Powell, Norgran
Piano Solos, Bud Powell, Clef
Piano Solos #2, Bud Powell, Clef
Sing and Swing with Buddy Rich, Norgran
Struggle, Woody Guthrie, Smithsonian Folkways
Swinging Brass with the Oscar Peterson Trio, Verve
The Tal Farlow Album, Tal Farlow, Norgran
These Are the Blues, Ella Fitzgerald, Verve
Toshiko's Piano, Toshiko Akiyoshi, Norgran
Urbanity, Hank Jones, Clef

Time magazine covers
David Merrick, 25 March 1966
Robert F. Kennedy, 16 September 1966
Inside the Viet Cong, 25 August 1967
Mayor Carl Stokes, 17 November 1967
Gen. Vo Nguyen Giap, 9 February 1968
Sen. Eugene McCarthy, 22 March 1968
Nguyen Van Thieu, 28 March 1969
Gov. George Wallace, 27 March 1972

References

External links
U.S. Navy Art Collection: David Stone Martin
David Stone Martin album covers at:
Birkajazz.com
LP Cover Lover
Vinyl Culture Quarterly
Jazz at First Sight: The Art of David Stone Martin (July–December 2010, Jazz at Lincoln Center)

1913 births
1992 deaths
American illustrators
People from Roosevelt, New Jersey
School of the Art Institute of Chicago alumni
People of the United States Office of War Information